The Fake is a 2013 South Korean animated film written and directed by Yeon Sang-ho.

The film had its world premiere in the Vanguard section of the 2013 Toronto International Film Festival on September 7, 2013, and went on to screen at various international film festivals before being released domestically on November 21, 2013. It won Best Animation awards at the Sitges Film Festival and Gijón International Film Festival, and was named the Best Korean Independent Film of 2013 by the Association of Korean Independent Film & Video.

A blistering critique of organized religion set in a rural village where a manipulative church minister schemes to defraud his flock, The Fake is Yeon's sophomore feature after the acclaimed and divisive The King of Pigs (2011).

Plot
With their municipality scheduled to be flooded to make way for the construction of a new dam, the devout denizens of a rural village have placed their faith in Choi Gyeong-seok, a church elder who promises to relocate the flock. Choi tells the villagers they will build a church and a new housing development where they will all be able to live together after the town is completely submerged. He also says that only 144,000 people can go to heaven, and that church offerings are mandatory if one wants to "secure their spot." Even the town's much-revered Reverend Sung, a young and good-looking minister who seemingly has the ability to heal the sick, approves of Choi's plans. Behind his guise of devotion, however, Choi is a practiced con man posing as a representative of a fake religion; his true aim is to defraud the villagers of their resettlement compensation. The only obstacle to the scheme is Kim Min-chul, a skeptical outcast who accidentally discovers evidence of Choi's past misdeeds and suddenly finds himself becoming the center of resistance against the church institution.

But Min-chul himself is hardly a saint. One of the village's most vile and untrustworthy characters, Min-chul is a low-life neighborhood thug who gambles and drinks too much. He regularly beats his wife and daughter Young-sun, a young factory worker who's been saving up for her lifelong dream of going to college in Seoul.

No one in the village believes Min-chul and his attempts to expose Choi to the authorities fall on deaf ears. But after Young-sun is forced into prostitution by Choi, Min-chul becomes obsessed with revenge and makes a fateful decision to take matters into his own hands.

Cast
Yang Ik-june as Kim Min-chul 
Oh Jung-se as Sung Chul-woo
Kwon Hae-hyo as Choi Gyeong-seok
Park Hee-von as Kim Young-sun

Release
The Fake went on limited release in South Korea on November 21, 2013. It received almost 22,000 admissions, which is a solid figure for a low-budget independent film.

The film also had a one-week theatrical run from November 15–20, 2013 at the CGV Cinema in Koreatown, Los Angeles, in order to qualify for submission to the Academy Award for Best Animated Feature. It did not get nominated.

Television adaptation
The second season of OCN's Save Me was based on this film. It premiered in May 2019 and concluded in late June 2019.

Awards and nominations

Film festivals
The Fake was screened at the following film festivals:

2013 Toronto International Film Festival
2013 Fantastic Fest 
2013 Busan International Film Festival
2013 Sitges Film Festival
2013 AFI Fest 
2013 Tallinn Black Nights Film Festival
2013 Hong Kong Asian Film Festival 
2014 Göteborg International Film Festival  
2014 Jameson Dublin International Film Festival  
2014 Fantasporto

References

External links
 

South Korean animated films
Next Entertainment World films
Animated drama films
Films about religion
Films critical of religion
Films directed by Yeon Sang-ho
2010s South Korean films